This article details the Huddersfield Giants rugby league football club's 2016 season. This was the 21st season of the Super League era and the Huddersfield Giants 14th since promotion back to the top flight in 2003.

Table

To be inserted.

2016 fixtures and results

2016 Super League Fixtures

2016 Super 8 Qualifiers

Player appearances
Super League Only

 = Injured

 = Suspended

Challenge Cup

Player appearances
Challenge Cup Games only

2016 squad statistics

 Appearances and points include (Super League, Challenge Cup and Play-offs) as of 28 March 2016.

 = Injured
 = Suspended

2016 transfers in/out

In

Out

References

Huddersfield Giants seasons
Super League XXI by club